Osmani Urrutia Ramírez (also spelled Osmany) (born June 29, 1976 in Jobabo, Las Tunas Province, Cuba) is a Cuban baseball player. He plays right field for the Las Tunas Magos of the Cuban National Series and for the Cuba national baseball team.

Career in Cuba
Playing for Las Tunas, Urrutia hit over .400 in the Cuban National Series for three straight years, beginning in 2000 (.431 in 2000-2001, .408 in 2001-2002 and .421 in 2002-2003).

International experience
Urrutia, who is 1.78m (5'10") and 104 kg (229 pounds), has competed in many international tournaments for Cuba, including: 
 2001 World Championship (Taiwan)
 2000 and 2001 World Cup of Baseball in the Netherlands
 2003 Pan American Games in Santo Domingo, Dominican Republic
 2003 World Cup of Baseball (Cuba)
 2004 Athens Olympics
 2006 World Baseball Classic

During the 2005 World Cup of Baseball, Urrutia hit for a .387 average with five runs batted in (RBI) and 12 hits in 31 at-bats. During the 2006 World Baseball Classic, Urrutia batted .387 with one home run and seven RBIs in eight games, leading team Cuba to the championship game, where they lost 10-6 to Japan.

References

External links
 

1976 births
Living people
2006 World Baseball Classic players
Baseball players at the 2004 Summer Olympics
Baseball players at the 2007 Pan American Games
Leñadores de Las Tunas players
Olympic baseball players of Cuba
Olympic gold medalists for Cuba
Olympic medalists in baseball
People from Jobabo
Medalists at the 2004 Summer Olympics
Pan American Games gold medalists for Cuba
Pan American Games medalists in baseball
Central American and Caribbean Games gold medalists for Cuba
Competitors at the 2006 Central American and Caribbean Games
Central American and Caribbean Games medalists in baseball
Medalists at the 2007 Pan American Games